Klobuky is a municipality and village in Kladno District in the Central Bohemian Region of the Czech Republic. It has about 1,000 inhabitants.

Administrative parts
Villages of Čeradice, Kobylníky, Kokovice and Páleček are administrative parts of Klobuky.

Geography
It is located in a flat agricultural landscape of the Lower Eger Table.

Etymology
The name of the village probably derives from its ancient owner or founder named Klobouk (which is also the Czech word for "hat", in old Czech also for "helmet"). Hence the helmet is in the coat of arms adopted in 2005.

History
The first written mention of Klobuky is from 1226, when it was a property of the Doksany convent.

Sights
The major local sight is an alleged prehistoric menhir, with a height of  the tallest in the Czech Republic. It is an upright, lonely standing stone, called Kamenný pastýř ("stone shepherd") or Kamenný muž ("stone man"), in a field several hundred metres northwest of the village.

The Church of Saint Lawrence dates back to 14th century, but it was rebuilt in 1729.

Notable people
Jindřich Šimon Baar (1869–1925), writer; was a priest in Klobuky in 1899–1909
Jan Malypetr (1873–1947), politician, prime minister of Czechoslovakia
Ivan Krasko (1876–1958), Slovak poet; worked in local sugar refinery in 1905–1912
Karel Toman (1877–1946), poet

Gallery

References

External links

 

Villages in Kladno District